Rainbow Ranch may refer to:

Rainbow Ranch, a 1933 American film
Rainbow Ranch, a NRHP historic home
Rainbow Ranch Boys, Musician Hank Snow's band